The Ashuelot River is a tributary of the Connecticut River, approximately  long, in southwestern New Hampshire in the United States. It is the longest tributary of the Connecticut River within New Hampshire.

Etymology 
Ashuelot is a Native American word meaning "collection of many waters".

Course
The Ashuelot River rises out of Butterfield Pond south of Sunapee Mountain in Pillsbury State Park, near Washington in southeastern Sullivan County. It flows southwest through Ashuelot Pond into Cheshire County, then south past Keene and Swanzey and along the east side of the Pisgah Mountains.

The river is impounded to supply hydroelectricity at Marlow, Keene, Swanzey, and Hinsdale. The river is part of the Atlantic Salmon Restoration Program of the U.S. government.

Covered bridges 
The Ashuelot River has several covered bridges spanning its waters. All are listed on the National Register of Historic Places. From source to mouth:
 Carleton Bridge N.H. #7 - Swanzey (South Branch Ashuelot River)
 Sawyers Crossing Covered Bridge N.H. #6 - Swanzey
 West Swanzey Covered Bridge N.H. #5 - West Swanzey
 Slate Covered Bridge N.H. #4 - Swanzey
 Coombs Covered Bridge N.H. #2 - Winchester
 Ashuelot Covered Bridge N.H. #1 - Ashuelot

Selected tributaries

From source to mouth:
Cherry Brook (headwaters of the Ashuelot)
Butler Brook
Abbott Brook
Grassy Brook
Dart Brook
Thompson Brook
The Branch/Beaver Brook
Ash Swamp Brook
South Branch Ashuelot River
California Brook
Wheelock Brook
Mirey Brook
Broad Brook

See also

List of New Hampshire rivers

References

External links
Keene, NH: Ashuelot River Park
Atlas of the Ashuelot River (PDF)

Rivers of New Hampshire
Tributaries of the Connecticut River
Rivers of Cheshire County, New Hampshire
Rivers of Sullivan County, New Hampshire
New Hampshire placenames of Native American origin